Kings Heath (historically, and still occasionally King's Heath) is a suburb of south Birmingham, England, four miles south of the city centre. Historically in Worcestershire, it is the next suburb south from Moseley on the A435, Alcester road.

History

Kings Heath came into being as a village in the 18th century when improvements to the Alcester to Birmingham road acted as a catalyst for the development of new houses and farms. Prior to this, the area was largely uninhabited wasteland run by the Royal Borough of Kings Norton.

The streets running off High Street are dominated by pre-1919 terraced, owner-occupied housing.

A number of independent shops have taken advantage of comparatively cheap rents in the side roads off High Street, leading to an influx of boutiques and the start of an (organic) café culture. In 2008, the businesses agreed to establish a Business Improvement District, which top-slices a proportion of their local business taxes to go directly into improvements and promotion of the area.

The local community still refers to Kings Heath as a "village" even though it has been part of Birmingham for over a century. Its centre at the High Street / Vicarage Road junction has been developed to form an attractive public square which is used as a venue for a monthly farmers' market and other events.

On 28 July 2005, Kings Heath was hit by a major (by European standards) tornado which damaged several shops on High Street and All Saints' Church. The tornado then moved on to damage many houses in Balsall Heath. There were no fatalities.

In 2021 the area was named an official gayborhood alongside the likes of The Castro, San Francisco and The Marais in Paris, being well marked as a gayborhood with its first "Queens Heath Pride" parade in September 2021.

Education

Kings Heath has several notable schools including  Kings Heath Boys, Wheelers Lane Technology College, King Edward VI Camp Hill School for Boys, King Edward VI Camp Hill School for Girls and Bishop Challoner Catholic College.

Public transport  
Kings Heath is serviced by National Express West Midlands' bus routes 11 (A/C), 27, 35, 50, 76 and Diamond Bus routes 50 (only Maypole to Birmingham rather than from Druids Heath, part run with National Express), 34, 69 and 150. From 3rd January 2023, Stagecoach Midlands will commence operating the extended service 46 to the Q.E. Hospital via Northfield.

Features
The central shopping area runs along High Street and Alcester Road, and the shops include branches of national chain stores, independent bakeries, butchers and greengrocers, charity shops, supermarkets, electrical retailers and opticians. There are also a number of pubs, churches and schools on and around High Street.

Kings Heath has two parks: Kings Heath Park, which is famous as the setting for the popular ATV series Gardening Today, and Highbury Park, which is adjacent to Highbury Hall, a former residence of Joseph Chamberlain, a British politician and former mayor. Kings Heath Park has "Green Flag" status. It features a Victorian-styled tea room and is the venue for the annual Gardener's Weekend Show, which comes under the Royal Horticultural Society and is one of the top regional events for gardening enthusiasts to show off their vegetables, floral displays, etc.

The Hare & Hounds public house, in Kings Heath High Street, was the location of the first concert by UB40 on 9 February 1979, which is commemorated by a PRS for Music plaque. The pub was rebuilt in 1907, but is Grade II listed, as it has retained many original Art Nouveau internal fixtures.  The pub is still an important local music venue.

Sport and leisure
Kings Heath Stadium was a greyhound track that existed from 1927 until its closure in 1971. The site was first developed in 1923 at Alcester Lane's End on the southern outskirts of Kings Heath as the venue for the annual Kings Heath Horse Show. The ground was converted to include a greyhound track and the first race took place on 21 May 1927. After the Horse Show moved elsewhere in the 1960s, the ground was exclusively used for greyhound racing until being permanently closed in 1971. The land was eventually sold for housing development.

An 18-hole golf course opened in 1926 just to the south of the race track along the Alcester Road. This is also the site of the modern Cocks Moors Woods sports and leisure centre, the largest of its kind in south Birmingham.

Kings Heath Baths was an indoor facility on Institute Road that first opened on 15 August 1923. For many years, the swimming pool was drained and floored over during the winter so it could be used as a dance hall, with additional badminton courts also provided. The baths closed in 1987 and the building was subsequently demolished.

The Kingsway Cinema opened on High Street in March 1925 and remained open for more than fifty years until its closure in May 1980. The cinema was later converted into a bingo hall, first run by Essoldo Bingo, then Gala Bingo, but eventually closed in 2007. The building was largely destroyed by a fire on 17 September 2011. It was auctioned off in 2016 to a local building development company and demolition work was carried out at the rear of the building in early 2018. The Grade A locally listed facade at the front was largely unaffected by the 2011 fire and the redevelopment plans include restoring this to its former glory.

Notable residents
People born in Kings Heath
 Tommy Green (1873–1921), footballer who played for West Bromwich Albion
 Sydney S. Guy (1885–1971), founder of Guy Motors
 Albert Gardner (1887–1923), footballer who played for Birmingham City
 Frank Bowden (1904–?), footballer who played for Birmingham City and Coventry City
 Edna Iles (1905–2003), classical pianist
 Jim Roberts (1922–2019), architect whose works included the Rotunda in central Birmingham
 Peter Aldis (1927–2008), footballer who played for Aston Villa
 Ann Jones (born 1938), tennis player who won seven Grand Slam Championships
 Martin Barre (born 1946), guitarist for Jethro Tull
 Dave Latchford (born 1948), footballer who played for Birmingham City
 Bob Latchford (born 1951), footballer who played for Birmingham City, Everton and England
 Peter Latchford (born 1952), footballer who played for West Bromwich Albion and Celtic
 Toyah Willcox (born 1958), musician and actress
 Garry Thompson (born 1959), footballer who played for Coventry City, West Bromwich Albion and Aston Villa
 Dave Linney (born 1961), footballer who played for Oxford United
 Gary Childs (born 1964), footballer for Walsall and Grimsby Town
 Kevin Ashley (born 1968), footballer who played for Birmingham City and Wolverhampton Wanderers
 Laura Mvula (born 1986), soul singer/songwriter

Notable residents
 J. R. R. Tolkien (1892–1973) moved to Kings Heath to live with his grandparents in 1895
 Anthony E. Pratt (1903–1994), inventor of the board game Cluedo
 Tommy Godwin (1920–2012), international cyclist who ran a cycle shop in Kings Heath from 1950 to 1986
 Judith Cutler (born 1946), crime fiction writer
 Stuart Linnell MBE (born 1947 in Northfield, Birmingham), radio and TV presenter
 Trevor Burton (born 1949), guitarist and founding member of The Move
 Paul Dyson (born 1959), footballer for Coventry City and Stoke City who ran a sports shop in Kings Heath after his retirement
 Joe Lycett (born 1988), British comedian, previously lived with his parents in Hall Green

In popular culture

The 2011 musical film Turbulence was shot in the area, with much of the film's action taking place in the Hare & Hounds pub.

The 2013 song "Green Garden" by Birmingham born Laura Mvula is an elegy to her home in Kings Heath.

The BBC documentary Fighting For Air, about suburban air pollution, was filmed in Kings Heath in 2017 and broadcast on BBC2 on 10 January 2018.

See also
 Moseley and Kings Heath ward
 Brandwood ward
 Ritz Ballroom, Kings Heath

References

External links
Birmingham City Council
History of Kings Heath
1884 Ordnance Survey map of King's Heath
1887 Ordnance Survey map of King's Heath

Areas of Birmingham, West Midlands